Pavlo Mikolajovich Zibrov is a Ukrainian pop singer (baritone), song writer. People's Artist of Ukraine (1996). He became notable for his song Khreshchatyk.

Pavlo Zibrov was born on 21 June 1957 in a village of Chervone, Nemyriv Raion, Vinnytsia Oblast in a family of Russian Nikolai Ivanovich and Ukrainian Hanna Kyrilivna. His mother worked as a teacher, and his father was a master of all trades. After a couple of years at school, Pavlo moved with his family to Kyiv. He graduated from the Kyiv Lysenko special music boarding school which he started sometime in 1965, while his brother attended a military-music college in Moscow. In 1981 Zibrov graduated from the orchestra department of Kiev State Conservatory of Tchaikovsky and in 1992 - the vocal department.

In 1986-93 he was a vocalist of the State symphony orchestra of Ukraine. Since 1994 Zibrov is a director of his own Pavlo Zibrov Theater of Song and instructor at the department of pop singing of the Kyiv National University of Culture and Arts.

A few years ago he fell in love with Ukrainian journalist Oksana Dumska. He dedicates a song "Queen of my dreams" to his sweetheart.

References

External links
 Official website
 Pavlo Zibrov «Золотий Фонд української естради»
 
 

1957 births
Living people
People from Vinnytsia Oblast
Kyiv Conservatory alumni
Recipients of the title of People's Artists of Ukraine
Ukrainian male singers
Ukrainian people of Russian descent
Academic staff of the Kyiv National University of Culture and Arts
Recipients of the title of Merited Artist of Ukraine